Chi Orionis (Chi Ori, χ Orionis, χ Ori) is the name of two stars:

 Chi1 Orionis (54 Orionis, HD 39587)
 Chi2 Orionis (62 Orionis, HD 41117)

All of them were member of asterism 司怪 (Sī Guài), Deity in Charge of Monsters, Turtle Beak mansion.

References

Orionis, Chi
Orion (constellation)